Nīnole (also spelled Hinole, Ninole, or Ninoli) is the name of two unincorporated communities on the island of Hawaii in Hawaii County, Hawaii, United States. In the Hawaiian language Nīnole means "bending". Nīnole also has the highest percentage of people of Italian descent in Hawaii.

Kaū 
One Nīnole is in the Kaū District south of Route 11 (Hawaii Belt Road) adjacent to the south of Punaluu Beach.
It was on Nīnole Cove, a small bay at the shore of what is now Sea Mountain Golf Course. The village was the birthplace of Henry Ōpūkahaia (1792–1818) who inspired the missionary movement that forever changed Hawaii. It was mostly destroyed by a tsunami after the 1868 Hawaii earthquake.
Its elevation is 85 feet (26 m).  Because the community has borne multiple names, the Board on Geographic Names officially designated it "Nīnole" in 2000.

Hāmākua 
The other Nīnole is on the Hāmākua Coast north of Hilo along Route 19 (Māmalahoa Highway) south of Pāpaʻaloa and north of Hakalau.
It has a post office with the ZIP code 96773.

References

Italian-American culture
Unincorporated communities in Hawaii County, Hawaii
Populated places on Hawaii (island)
Unincorporated communities in Hawaii